Ghevar or Ghewar (Devanagari:घेवर) is a Rajasthani cuisine disc-shaped sweet made from ghee, flour, and sugar syrup. It is traditionally associated with the month of Shravan and the Teej and Raksha Bandhan festivals. It is a part of Rajasthani tradition and is gifted to newly married daughter on Sinjara, the day preceding Gangaur and Teej. Besides Rajasthan, it is also famous in the adjoining states of Haryana, Delhi, Gujarat, Uttar Pradesh, and Madhya Pradesh. Ghevar is exported to foreign countries too.

Ghevar is savored by MasterChef Sanjeev Kapoor too. Ghevar made its way into the coveted MasterChef Australia when Depinder Chhibber served the sweet in audition round of Season 13.

Preparation 
Ghevar is a disc-shaped sweet cake made with flour, ghee (clarified butter), and soaked in sugar syrup. Flour, ghee, milk, and water are mixed to make a batter. The batter is then poured in ghee in disc shape and is fried to a golden honeycomb-like texture.  Common toppings include saffron, spices and nuts.

Variations 
Ghevar comes in multiple varieties, including plain, mawa, and malai ghevar. Jaipur's LMB introduced variations like Chhena Ghevar in 1961. Ghevar can be soaked in sugar-water syrup or is often topped with rabdi.A special variation for weight watchers and diabetics is its sugar free version available nowadays.

References

Indian desserts
Rajasthani desserts

 Ghevar